is a Japanese baseball pitcher. He pitched for the Saitama Seibu Lions and Yokohama BayStars of Nippon Professional Baseball from 1998 through 2010.

External links

Yoshihiro Doi, JapaneseBallPlayers.com

Living people
1976 births
Baseball people from Saitama (city)
Japanese expatriate baseball players in the United States
Nippon Professional Baseball pitchers
Seibu Lions players
Yokohama BayStars players
Saitama Seibu Lions players
Na Koa Ikaika Maui players
Japanese baseball coaches
Nippon Professional Baseball coaches